Rocky and Berenice Miller Park is a baseball stadium in Evanston, Illinois.  It is the home field of the Northwestern Wildcats college baseball team.  The stadium holds 600 people seated and opened for baseball in 1943. In 2014, the park began a renovation, and reopened on April 2, 2016, against the Michigan Wolverines. The renovation added the Hayden Clubhouse, which holds the team's locker room. A new players' lounge, and a new LED scoreboard are among other additions to the stadium.

See also
 List of NCAA Division I baseball venues

References

College baseball venues in the United States
Baseball venues in Illinois
Northwestern University campus
Northwestern Wildcats baseball
Sports venues in Cook County, Illinois
1943 establishments in Illinois